is a Japanese freestyle skier who competes internationally.
He competed for Japan at the FIS Freestyle Ski and Snowboarding World Championships 2017 in Sierra Nevada, Spain, where he won a gold medal in Moguls, and another gold medal in Dual moguls.

Horishima won the bronze medal in the Beijing 2022 Winter Olympics men's moguls with a score of 81.48.

References

External links

1997 births
Living people
Japanese male freestyle skiers
Freestyle skiers at the 2018 Winter Olympics
Freestyle skiers at the 2022 Winter Olympics
Olympic freestyle skiers of Japan
Olympic medalists in freestyle skiing
Olympic bronze medalists for Japan
Medalists at the 2022 Winter Olympics
Sportspeople from Gifu Prefecture
Asian Games medalists in freestyle skiing
Asian Games gold medalists for Japan
Freestyle skiers at the 2017 Asian Winter Games
Medalists at the 2017 Asian Winter Games
Universiade gold medalists for Japan
Universiade bronze medalists for Japan
Universiade medalists in freestyle skiing
Competitors at the 2019 Winter Universiade
21st-century Japanese people